David G. Watts is a Welsh games designer and publisher.  Originally a school geography teacher at Milford Haven Grammar School, he designed Railway Rivals, his most popular game, to teach the geography of Wales and upon retirement published it under the imprint Rostherne Games.  His games have been published worldwide with his greatest successes in Germany. Most use transportation as a theme but he has also designed abstract games, chess variants and a variety of race games.

Published games
Railway Rivals (Rostherne Games, Games Workshop, Schmidt Spiele, Laurin, and Queen Spiele
Pirate Island (Rostherne Games, and Schmidt Spiele)
Bus Boss
Send
Winchester
Scramble for Africa

External links

Living people
Board game designers
Year of birth missing (living people)